is a 1958 Japanese film directed by Umetsugu Inoue.

Cast 
 Yujiro Ishihara
 Mie Kitahara (北原三枝)
 Mari Shiraki : Yanagi Rumiko

References 

1958 films
Films directed by Umetsugu Inoue
Nikkatsu films
1950s Japanese films